William Willard McMillan (January 29, 1929 – June 10, 2000) was a world-class American sport shooter. Competing in ISSF 25 meter rapid fire pistol, he won an Olympic gold medal in 1960, was part of the American winning team at the 1952 World Championships, and won several gold and silver medals at the Pan American Games between 1955 and 1979.

Biography
McMillan was born in Frostburg, Maryland. He attended Turtle Creek High School in Pennsylvania. His professional career was in the United States Marine Corps, eventually with the rank of lieutenant colonel. After his retirement he served as sheriff in San Diego County, California. He died in Encinitas, California, on June 6, 2000.

Sport shooting

Between 1952 and 1976 he competed in the 25 m rapid fire pistol event in six Olympics, missing only the 1956 Games due to malfunctioning of his weapon during the US trials. He won a gold medal at the 1960 Summer Olympics in Rome and competed at five other Olympic Games.

McMillan won one world, five Pan American, and four national titles in the rapid fire pistol and free pistol events, as well as several silver medals at all these competitions, the last two aged 50. In his career, he set two world shooting records.

In 1994, USA Shooting inducted him into the USA Shooting Hall of Fame.

Military service

McMillan enlisted in the United States Marine Corps in 1946. He was commissioned a second lieutenant in 1953 and retired as a lieutenant colonel in 1974. He served in the Korean and Vietnam wars.

From 1974 to 1981, he worked as a Weapons Training Coordinator at San Diego County, California. where he was injured in a shooting accident at the old Camp Elliot range.

In 1978, the Marine Corps established the McMillan Trophy for shooting in his honor.

Military awards

 Distinguished Pistol Shot, June 16, 1950
 Distinghuished Marksman, June 3, 1954
 Distinghuished International Shooter, May 23, 1963

See also
List of athletes with the most appearances at Olympic Games

References

External links

1929 births
2000 deaths
American male sport shooters
United States Distinguished Marksman
ISSF pistol shooters
Olympic gold medalists for the United States in shooting
Olympic medalists in shooting
Medalists at the 1960 Summer Olympics
Shooters at the 1952 Summer Olympics
Shooters at the 1960 Summer Olympics
Shooters at the 1964 Summer Olympics
Shooters at the 1968 Summer Olympics
Shooters at the 1972 Summer Olympics
Shooters at the 1976 Summer Olympics
Pan American Games gold medalists for the United States
Pan American Games silver medalists for the United States
Pan American Games medalists in shooting
United States Marine Corps colonels
United States Marine Corps personnel of the Korean War
Recipients of the Legion of Merit
Shooters at the 1955 Pan American Games
Shooters at the 1963 Pan American Games
Shooters at the 1967 Pan American Games
Shooters at the 1979 Pan American Games
Medalists at the 1955 Pan American Games
Medalists at the 1963 Pan American Games
Medalists at the 1967 Pan American Games
Medalists at the 1979 Pan American Games
United States Marine Corps personnel of the Vietnam War
20th-century American people